Blart II: The Boy Who Was Wanted Dead Or Alive - Or Both is the sequel to Dominic Barker's Blart: The Boy Who Didn't Want To Save The World, released in 2007. It was published by Bloomsbury Publishing Plc.

Plot summary
Blart, after the imprisonment of Zoltab, is living the good life on his own pig farm. But a wily merchant named Uther has conned him out of everything he owns and his freedom by a game of cards called "Muggins".

To play Muggins, the dealer simply picks two cards from the deck, hands one to the non-dealer and keeps one himself. Each player turns over their cards. If the cards were the same, say, a king and a king, then the dealer wins. If the cards are different, say, a three and a five, then the non-dealer wins. Even Blart has grasped it that the chances of the non-dealer winning is drastically in his favour and resolves to play the game with Uther to make money.

However, no sooner than Blart bets stakes in the game of Muggins than Uther begins to win every round. But then quite out of the blue, Capablanca arrives to tell him that Blart and the other questors are wanted, dead or alive - or both. They are wanted because it is believed that they are minions of Zoltab, even though it was them that imprisoned him. So Blart, Capablanca and Uther (who must help them as he is wanted for associating with Blart) must find and warn the other questors.

After gathering the original company (with the exception of the deceased dwarf Tungsten) they must travel to where Capablanca has imprisoned Zoltab, so as to prove their innocence. However, Capablanca has difficulty remembering where he has imprisoned the last lord.

2007 British novels
British children's novels
British fantasy novels
Bloomsbury Publishing books
Novels by Dominic Barker
2007 children's books
Children's fantasy novels